Faustinopolis, also Colonia Faustinopolis and Halala, was an ancient city in the south of Cappadocia, about 20 km south of Tyana. It was named after the empress Faustina, the wife of Marcus Aurelius, who died there in a village, which her husband, by establishing a colony in it, raised to the rank of a town under the name of Faustinopolis. Hierocles assigns the place to Cappadocia Secunda, and it is mentioned also in the Antonine and Jerusalem Itineraries. The town was close to the defiles of the Cilician Gates, and was likely situated at modern-day Toraman, Niğde Province, Turkey. Following the Muslim conquests and the subsequent Arab raids, the site was abandoned for the nearby fortress of Loulon. 

Faustinopolis is a titular see of the Roman Catholic Church.

References

Cappadocia (Roman province)
Catholic titular sees in Asia
Ancient Greek archaeological sites in Turkey
Roman towns and cities in Turkey
Coloniae (Roman)
Former populated places in Turkey
Geography of Niğde Province
History of Niğde Province
Populated places in ancient Cappadocia